Albavilla is a comune (municipality) in the Province of Como in the Italian region Lombardy, located about  north of Milan and about  east of Como.

References

External links
 Some pictures and information about Albavilla